Overpressure is a pressure difference, relative to a normal pressure, in various circumstances:
 In engineering, the pressure difference over the wall thickness of a pressure vessel
 In geology, geologic overpressure, the primary cause of oil gushers
 In autoclave terminology, process pressure above standard given on a pressure/temperature table

Military science
Overpressure or blast overpressure, the pressure caused by a shock wave over and above normal atmospheric pressure
Overpressure (CBRN protection), a method to create a safe toxin free area against airborne contaminants